Polycarpaea balfourii is a species of plant in the family Caryophyllaceae. It is endemic to Yemen.  Its natural habitats are subtropical or tropical dry shrubland and rocky areas.

References

Endemic flora of Socotra
balfourii
Least concern plants
Taxonomy articles created by Polbot